Bernard Blaquart (born 16 August 1957) is a French former professional footballer who was most recently the manager of Ligue 1 side Nîmes Olympique. During his playing career he represented Bordeaux, Toulouse, Toulon and Stade Français, making almost 100 appearances in the top two divisions of French football.

Following his retirement from playing, Blaquart moved into management and coached a number of lower-league clubs including Lunel and Montluçon before joining Ligue 2 outfit Grenoble as reserve team manager in 2004. He was appointed as manager of the senior team for the last 8 matches of the 2005–06 season following the departure of Thierry Goudet to Brest, and led the side to a 10th-place finish before returning to his post with the reserves. In 2008, he became Head of Youth Development at Grenoble and held the position for two years before taking up a similar role at Tours. In August 2012, he was given the manager's job at Tours on a full-time basis, replacing the outgoing German coach Peter Zeidler.

References

1957 births
Living people
French footballers
Association football forwards
FC Girondins de Bordeaux players
Toulouse FC players
SC Toulon players
Stade Français (association football) players
Ligue 1 players
Ligue 2 players
French football managers
Ligue 1 managers
Ligue 2 managers
Grenoble Foot 38 managers
Tours FC managers
Nîmes Olympique managers